Suzuko (written:  or  in hiragana) is a feminine Japanese given name. Notable people with the name include:

, Japanese swimmer
, Japanese voice actress
, Japanese gymnast

Fictional characters
, character in the anime series AKB0048
, character in the manga series Spriggan

See also
8712 Suzuko, main-belt asteroid

Japanese feminine given names